Kočićevo (Кочићево) was a former village in Bačka, Serbia. It was located in the Bačka Topola municipality. In 1971, it was the smallest village in Vojvodina with only 13 families. It was completely abandoned during the 1970s. Today, at the location of the former village, there is only one house and cemetery.

See also
List of places in Serbia
List of cities, towns and villages in Vojvodina

History of Bačka
Former populated places in Serbia
20th century in Vojvodina